Dothidea is a genus of fungi belonging to the family Dothideaceae.  The genus was first described in 1818 by Elias Magnus Fries.  The type species is Dothidea sambuci.

The genus has almost cosmopolitan distribution.

Species
As accepted by Species Fungorum;

Dothidea acerva 
Dothidea amorphae 
Dothidea artemisiae 
Dothidea azmati 
Dothidea baccharidis 
Dothidea berberidis 
Dothidea bullata 
Dothidea colliculosa 
Dothidea decolorans 
Dothidea edgeworthiae 
Dothidea eucalypti 
Dothidea frangulae 
Dothidea funesta 
Dothidea globulosa 
Dothidea hippophaes 
Dothidea insculpta 
Dothidea juglandis 
Dothidea kunmingensis 
Dothidea machaeriophila 
Dothidea muelleri 
Dothidea neivae 
Dothidea noxia 
Dothidea orgaoensis 
Dothidea petiolaris 
Dothidea pulchella 
Dothidea rugodisca 
Dothidea rutae 
Dothidea sambuci 
Dothidea stryphnodendri 
Dothidea tetraspora 
Dothidea vacciniorum 

Species Fungorum lists up to 387 records of Dothidea species, but only the above list have stayed as Dothidea, the rest have been moved to various families and genera.

References

External links
Dothidea images and occurrence data from GBIF

Dothideales
Taxa named by Elias Magnus Fries
Taxa described in 1818
Dothideomycetes genera